Field Day is a studio album by Dag Nasty, released in 1988 through Giant Records; it was released in Europe through We Bite Records.

The album features a cover of The Ruts classic "Staring at the Rude Boys." It also offers a new recording of Dag Nasty's "Under Your Influence." The original version appears on the band's debut LP Can I Say, with vocalist Dave Smalley.

The CD bonus track "12XU" was written by Wire, and was also covered by Brian Baker's former band Minor Threat.

The album had sold more than 30,000 copies within a year of its release.

Track listing
"Trouble Is" - 3:33
"Field Day" - 2:28
"Things That Make No Sense" - 2:44
"The Ambulance Song" - 3:38
"Staring at the Rude Boys" - 2:49
"13 Seconds Underwater" - 0:46
"La Penita" - 4:09
"Dear Mrs. Touma" - 2:37
"Matt" - 1:34
"I've Heard" - 0:12
"Under Your Influence" - 3:37
"Typical" - 2:37
"Here's to You" - 2:49
"16 Count" - 0:21

CD bonus tracks
"Never Green Lane" - 1:55
"You're Mine"  - 3:52
"All Ages Show" - 2:38
"12XU" - 1:31

Tracks 16 & 17 originally from the All Ages Show 7-inch EP.
Tracks 15 & 18 originally from the Trouble Is 12-inch EP.

Personnel
Dag Nasty
Peter Cortner - Vocals
Brian Baker - Guitars
Doug Carrion - Bass
Scott Garrett - Drums

References

Dag Nasty albums
1988 albums